Norway participated in the Eurovision Song Contest 2012 in Baku, Azerbaijan. The Norwegian entry was selected through Melodi Grand Prix 2012, a national selection consisting of three semi-finals and a final, organised by the Norwegian broadcaster NRK. Tooji represented Norway with the song "Stay", which qualified from the second semi-final and went on to place 26th (last) in the final, scoring 7 points.

Before Eurovision

Melodi Grand Prix 2012 
Melodi Grand Prix 2012 was the 50th edition of the Norwegian national final Melodi Grand Prix and selected Norway's entry for the Eurovision Song Contest 2012. The competition consisted of three semi-finals and a final in different cities across Norway, hosted by Marte Stokstad and Per Sundnes. The shows were televised on NRK1 as well as streamed online at NRK's official website nrk.no. The final was also broadcast online at the official Eurovision Song Contest website eurovision.tv.

Format 
The competition consisted of four shows: three semi-finals on 21 January, 28 January and 4 February 2012 and a final on 11 February 2012. Eight songs competed in each semi-final and the top three entries proceeded to the final. The results in the semi-finals were determined exclusively by public televoting. A jury panel also selected out of the remaining non-qualifying acts from the semi-finals a wildcard to proceed to the final. The results in the final were determined by public televoting and three regional juries.

Competing entries 
A submission period was opened by NRK between 30 June 2011 and 2 September 2011. Songwriters of any nationality were allowed to submit entries, while NRK reserved the right to choose the performers of the selected songs in consultation with the songwriters. At the close of the deadline, a record-breaking 800 submissions were received. Twenty-four songs were selected for the competition by an eight-member jury panel consisting of representatives of NRK, record companies and production companies. The competing acts and songs were revealed between 27 October 2011 and 16 January 2012, while the songs were premiered on 16 January 2012.

Semi-finals
Three semi-finals took place on 21 January, 28 January, and 4 February 2012. Eight songs competed in each semi-final and the top three entries were selected to proceed to the final.

Final
Ten songs consisting of the nine semi-final qualifiers alongside the jury wildcard, Lise Karlsnes, competed during the final on 11 February 2012. The winner was selected over two rounds of voting. In the first round, the top four entries were selected by public televoting to proceed to the second round, the Gold Final. In the Gold Final, three regional juries from the three semi-final host cities awarded 1,000, 2,000, 3,000 and 4,000 points to their top four songs. The results of the public televote were then revealed by Norway's five regions and added to the jury scores, leading to the victory of "Stay" performed by Tooji with 155,480 votes. In addition to the performances of the competing entries, the interval acts featured performances of Eurovision Song Contest 2009 winner Alexander Rybak.

At Eurovision 
Norway competed in the second half of the second semi-final (16th on stage), on 24 May 2012, following Slovakia and preceding Bosnia and Herzegovina. Norway received 45 points and placed 10th, thus qualifying for the final on 26 May. The public awarded Norway 6th place with 72 points and the jury awarded 18th place (last) with 25 points. Norway tied for 10th place with Bulgaria, however, under tiebreak rules, the number of countries that voted for Norway (11) was higher than the number for Bulgaria (10). This resulted in Norway qualifying to the final over Bulgaria.

In the final, Norway was drawn to perform 12th, following Estonia and preceding Azerbaijan. The Norwegian entry scored a total of 7 points and placed 26th in the final. The public awarded Norway 24th place with 16 points and the jury awarded 24th place with 24 points. This was the eleventh last place finish for Norway in an international final.

Voting

Points awarded to Norway

Points awarded by Norway

References

External links
 Official rules NRK
 mgp webside NRK
Full national final on nrk.no

2012
Countries in the Eurovision Song Contest 2012
2012
Eurovision
Eurovision